The Kit Denton Fellowship is an Australian literary award given annually by the Australian Writers' Guild (AWG). It is presented to a writer who shows courage and excellence in performance writing. The winner receives $25,000 AUD to support them in their writing work and assist them in developing a marketable script. The award is named after Kit Denton, a lifetime member of the AWG, well known as a script writer, author, poet and lyricist. He wrote the international best selling novel, The Breaker, about the life and death of Breaker Morant. Kit Denton was the father of TV personality, Andrew Denton.

In 2011, the fellowship was relaunched as the Kit Denton Disfellowship.

Award winners
2007 – Ian David, script writer
2008 – Suzie Miller, playwright
2009 – Back to Back Theatre, a theatre company from Geelong, Victoria
2010 – George Catsi, writer / performer,
2011 – Kate McLennan and Kate McCartney for their project, Bleak.
2012 –  Angela Betzien for her script War Games

References

Australian literary awards
Dramatist and playwright awards